This is a list of Estonia national football team managers – association football managers who have coached the Estonia national football team.

Statistical summary

See also
 Estonia national football team

References

External links

Estonia